McNary Field  (Salem Municipal Airport) is in Marion County, Oregon, United States, two miles southeast of downtown Salem, which owns it. The airport is named for U.S. Senator Charles L. McNary.

McNary Field has had scheduled airline flights, including service on Delta Air Lines that ended in October 2008. The National Plan of Integrated Airport Systems for 2011–2015 categorized it as a primary commercial service facility based on enplanements in 2008 (more than 10,000 per year). Federal Aviation Administration records say the airport had 15,205 passenger boardings (enplanements) in calendar year 2008, an increase from 12,979 in 2007.

The Oregon Army National Guard - Army Aviation Support Facility (AASF) and charter flights also use the facilities.  McNary Field is the home of the Oregon Department of Aviation.

Airline service

United Airlines was the first airline at Salem, starting in 1941–42; their Boeing 737 SFO-MFR-SLE-PDX and back ended in 1980. Passenger airlines left McNary Field in 1993. The city campaigned to bring passenger airlines back, and on June 7, 2007 Delta Connection came to Salem with two CRJ-200 flights a day to Salt Lake City that ended on October 9, 2008.
Earlier, Horizon Air turboprops flew Salem to Portland and Seattle.

In April 2011 SeaPort Airlines, an Oregon-based airline, began 11 weekly flights between Newport Municipal Airport (Oregon), Salem and Portland International Airport. The service was short-lived and three months later in July 2011 SeaPort Airlines ended service at Salem.

Facilities
McNary Field covers 751 acres (304 ha) at an elevation of 214 feet (65 m).

The airport has a control tower, a restaurant, a general aviation center including limited flight training, and a small terminal. The terminal building is about  after an expansion in 2010 that added ticket counters and a baggage area, and enlarged the waiting area. The expanded facility is more than twice the size of the old terminal, and was designed by Mead & Hunt.

In the year ending September 30, 2013 the airport had 33,611 aircraft operations, average 92 per day: 87% general aviation, 7% military, and 5% air taxi. 216 aircraft were then based at the airport: 71% single-engine, 10% multi-engine, 5% jet, 5% helicopter, 1% glider, and 9% military.

Cargo carriers

See also 

 Oregon World War II Army Airfields

References

External links 
 Salem Municipal Airport - McNary Field: CityOfSalem.net  or http://www.flysalem.org/ FlySalem.org]
 www.FlySalem.com, unofficial website
 Oregon Department of Aviation: AIMS data for KSLE
 Aerial image as of July 2000 from USGS The National Map
 
 
 

Airports in Marion County, Oregon
World War II airfields in the United States
Airfields of the United States Army Air Forces Technical Service Command
Airfields of the United States Army Air Forces in Oregon
Transportation in Salem, Oregon